Feri may refer to:

 Attila Feri (born 1968), Romanian weightlifter
 Dominik Feri, Czech politician
 Yvonne Feri (born 1966), Swiss politician
 Feri Tradition, an initiatory tradition of modern Pagan witchcraft
 Federico Errazuriz Regional Institute